The 1997 Rally Australia was a motor racing event for rally cars. The event was held between October 29 and November 1, 1997, in Perth, Western Australia.

References

Rally Australia
Sports competitions in Perth, Western Australia
October 1997 sports events in Australia
1997 World Rally Championship season